Pension Volkmann was a folk rock band from East Berlin founded in 1983.

History
The singer and guitarist Peter Butschke (born 25 March 1950 in Berlin) and guitarist Reinhard Sonnenburg-Buchholz (21 September 1953 - 1 February 2007) developed their own unique style. Butschke sang with a sonorous voice, while Sonnenberg-Buchholz deployed a substantial musical skill. Their often socially-critical lyrics were written by Werner Karma. Their relatively open criticism of the government in East Germany contributed to their popularity.

Both musicians studied at the Hochschule für Musik Hanns Eisler in Berlin and together released three albums. However, after reunification, they did not continue to achieve significant success, largely for personal reasons. After a long interruption, they only performed at occasional concerts on a small scale. Today, Peter Butschke is still active as a musician and continues to perform as the Volkmann with "Micha" Herrmann (bass guitar), Jan Haasler (guitar) and Frank Gohlke (percussion).

Discography

Albums 
 1985: Die Gefühle (Amiga)
 1988: Vollpension (Amiga)
 1993: Traumtänzer

References

English translation of references
1.  Google translation Retrieved 2016-5-4

External links
 Website of Pension Volkmann
 Website of Peter Butschke
 Website of Volkmann

East German musical groups